This is a list of the Lucha Libre AAA Worldwide (AAA) roster, organized by role within the promotion. The alias (ring name) of the employee is written on the left, while the employee's real name is on the right. If a wrestler is inactive for any reason (due to injury, suspension, not wrestling for 30 days or other), that information is noted in the notes section. Other wrestlers have made guest appearances, especially North American wrestlers who have made special guest appearances, but unless they work a series of shows for AAA they will not be listed as part of the general roster.

As AAA has partnerships with Japan's Pro Wrestling Noah (NOAH), U.S. promotions Impact Wrestling, All Elite Wrestling (AEW), Major League Wrestling (MLW), and National Wrestling Alliance (NWA) wrestlers from those promotions may also make periodic appearances on AAA programming.

Personnel

Male wrestlers

Female wrestlers

Mini-Estrellas

Other on-air talent

Footnotes

References

Lucha Libre AAA Worldwide
Lists of professional wrestling personnel